The Tomb of the Unknown Soldier is a war memorial, dedicated to the Soviet soldiers killed during World War II. It is located on Mustaqillik Maydoni in Tashkent, the capital of Uzbekistan.

History
It contains the remains of an Uzbek soldier who died in the Battle of Moscow. The body was transferred to the authorities in the Uzbek SSR on May 7, 1975, in time for the 30th anniversary of the end of WWII. In 1999, it became part of the Square of Memory and Honour.

Gallery

See also 
 Tomb of the Unknown Soldier (Moscow)

References 

Soviet military memorials and cemeteries
Monuments and memorials built in the Soviet Union
Buildings and structures completed in 1975
Tombs of Unknown Soldiers
Monuments and memorials in Uzbekistan